Lee Majdoub (born May 31, 1982) is a Lebanese-born Canadian actor. He is known for his role as Agent Stone in Sonic the Hedgehog (2020) and its 2022 sequel. Majdoub has also appeared in the television programs, The 100, and Dirk Gently's Holistic Detective Agency. He is set to star as Basim Ibn Ishaq, the protagonist of Assassin's Creed Mirage, in 2023.

Early life 
Majdoub was born in Tripoli, Lebanon. He lived in Italy and Switzerland as a child before moving to Ottawa, Canada at 9 years old. His family later moved to Montreal. He graduated from California State University, Long Beach with a Bachelor of Science, Mechanical Engineering in 2005. At his sister's suggestion, Majdoub began taking acting classes when he was 20 years old while completing his studies.

Career 
Majdoub's first screen role was a small part in the 2007 television series, Bionic Woman. He continued acting with small roles in film and television. Through the early to mid-2010s Majdoub appeared in guest roles in Arrow, Once Upon a Time, UnREAL, and Supernatural. During this period Majdoub was cast as Carter in See No Evil 2 directed by the Soska Sisters. He worked with the Soska Sisters again in their segment for ABCs of Death 2.

In 2013, Majdoub performed in a Belfry Theatre production of the play, Helen's Necklace. In 2015, he appeared in the Belfry Theatre's production of Vanya and Sonia and Masha and Spike.

In 2017, he appeared in the second season of Dirk Gently's Holistic Detective Agency as Silas Dengdamor. He won "Best Male Guest Performance in a Dramatic Series" for his performance at the 2018 Leo Awards. Beginning in 2019, Majdoub played recurring roles in You Me Her and The 100. He was again nominated for "Best Guest Performance by a Male in a Dramatic Series" for his work on You Me Her at the 2020 Leo Awards, and again in the same category at the 2021 Leo Awards for his work on The 100.

In September 2018, Majdoub was cast opposite Jim Carrey in the live-action Sonic the Hedgehog film as Agent Stone. Upon release, Majdoub's character quickly became popular with fans of the franchise who highlighted his dynamic with Carrey's Doctor Robotnik. On 30 September 2021, it was announced that Majdoub would reprise his role as Agent Stone in the sequel, Sonic the Hedgehog 2.

In September 2022, Majdoub announced that he will be voice acting Basim Ibn Ishaq, the protagonist of the upcoming video game Assassin's Creed Mirage, replacing Carlo Rota, who voiced an older Basim in Assassin's Creed Valhalla.

Filmography

Film

Television

Video Games

References

External links 

Canadian male film actors
Canadian male television actors
Canadian male voice actors
Canadian people of Lebanese descent
21st-century Canadian male actors
1982 births
Living people
People from Tripoli, Lebanon
Lebanese male actors
21st-century Lebanese male actors
Lebanese male film actors
Lebanese male television actors
Lebanese emigrants to Canada